Elyakhin is a town and local council in the Central District of Israel. Located just south of Hadera and bordering the Emek Hefer Regional Council, it is accessible by local road 5812.

History
Elyakhin was founded in 1950 as an immigrant interim housing camp (ma'abara) near the ruins of the Palestinian village Khirbat Zalafa. It has a symbolic name, meaning "God will prepare", i.e. God prepared the land for the settlement of Jewish immigrants. The ma'abara eventually became an agricultural community (moshav), settled entirely by immigrants from Yemen.

Geography and structure
Elyakhin is bordered by Hadera in the north and the Hefer Valley Regional Council in the south. The adjacent villages in the regional council are Herev Le'et, Hibat Tzion and Givat Haim (Ihud).

Elyakhin consists of the eastern part of the town, as well as three western neighborhoods – HaAlonim, HaShikmim and HaOranim.

Public structures
Elyakhin has 11 synagogues, five of which are adjacent and located in the center of the town. Three more are located on the sides of HaBanim Park on the eastern part.

Elyakhin also has a community center and public library in the town's center.

References

Local councils in Central District (Israel)
1950 establishments in Israel
Populated places established in 1950